Vulueggi  is a mountain ridge in Skjåk Municipality in Innlandet county, Norway. The mountain is surrounded by several other notable mountains including Tordsnose to the north, Veltdalseggi and Benkehøa to the northeast, Høggøymen to the east, and Krosshø to the west.

The two southernmost of the three peaks form border points for the Reinheimen National Park. A small glacier sits on top of the mountain ridge.

See also
List of mountains of Norway

References

External links
 Vulueggi. Geoview.info.

Mountains of Innlandet
Skjåk